The Mormaer or Earl of Buchan was originally the provincial ruler of the medieval province of Buchan. Buchan was the first Mormaerdom in the High Medieval Kingdom of the Scots to pass into the hands of a non-Scottish family in the male line. The earldom had three lines in its history, not counting passings from female heirs to sons. Today, it is held by the Erskine family as a peerage. The current holder is Harry Erskine, 18th Earl of Buchan (b. 1960).

Mormaerdom of Buchan
The first recorded person who definitely held the position of mormaer was Gartnait, whose patronage is noted in the Gaelic Notes on the Book of Deer. The latter is the only significant source for the mormaerdom, and its existence makes Buchan one of Scotland's best documented provinces for native cultural institutions. After the death of Fergus, before 1214, Buchan became the first native mormaerdom to pass into the hands of a foreign family, the Comyns, though only through marriage. Alexander Comyn, Earl of Buchan inherited and continued his mother's title and line until it was conquered and forfeited during the Wars of Scottish Independence.

1374 creation
The title remained in crown hands until, later in the century, the title went to Alexander Stewart, the "Wolf of Badenoch". By this point, however, Buchan was drastically truncated and no longer a provincial lordship.

1469 creation
In 1469 the earldom was conferred on James Stewart. He was made Lord Auchterhouse at the same time, also in the Peerage of Scotland. Stewart was the second son of Sir James Stewart, the Black Knight of Lorn, and the younger brother of John Stewart, 1st Earl of Atholl (see Earl of Atholl, 1457 creation). The title descended in the direct male line until the death of his grandson, John, the third Earl, in 1551. John's only son by his first marriage, John Stewart, Master of Buchan, had been killed at the Battle of Pinkie in 1547. Buchan was therefore succeeded by his granddaughter, Christina, suo jure Countess of Buchan, the daughter of the Master of Buchan. She married Robert Douglas, son of Sir Robert Douglas of Lochleven and brother of William Douglas, 6th Earl of Morton. Robert assumed the title of Earl of Buchan in right of his wife. He was succeeded by his daughter, Mary, suo jure Countess of Buchan. She married James Erskine, younger son of John Erskine, Earl of Mar. James assumed the earldom in right of his wife. In 1617 they were created by Royal charter Earl and Countess of Buchan, with remainder to the heirs male of the marriage, whom failing, to the legitimate and nearest heirs-male and assignees of the Earl. In 1633 the precedence of the earldom was established by Act of Parliament as 1469. This line of the family failed on the death of their grandson, the eighth Earl, who died unmarried in 1695. The title passed by the terms of the 1617 charter to the heirs male of the 6th Earl i.e. to the heirs male of his younger brother Henry Erskine (see below).  Since 1695, the earls of Buchan are not heirs of line of the 1st Earl of Buchan.

The late Earl was succeeded by his kinsman David Erskine, 4th Lord Cardross, who became the ninth Earl. He was the great-grandson of Henry Erskine, younger brother of James Erskine, Earl of Buchan (of the 1617 creation; see Lord Cardross for earlier history of this branch of the Erskine family). His right to the earldom was acknowledged by the Scottish Parliament in 1698 and he later sat in the House of Lords as a Scottish Representative Peer. He was succeeded by his eldest surviving son, the tenth Earl. He was a Fellow of the Royal Society. His eldest surviving son, David, the eleventh Earl, was the founder of the Society of Antiquaries of Scotland but is best remembered as an eccentric. The latter was succeeded by his nephew, Henry, the twelfth Earl, the son of the Honourable Henry Erskine, Lord Advocate, third son of the tenth Earl. In 1850 Caroline, the wife of the 12th Earl, and David the 13th Earl, both converted to Roman Catholicism.

The line of the twelfth Earl failed on the death of his great-grandson, the fifteenth Earl, who died unmarried in 1960. The fifteenth Earl was succeeded by his kinsman, Donald Erskine, 7th Baron Erskine, who became the sixteenth Earl. He was a descendant of Lord Chancellor Thomas Erskine, 1st Baron Erskine, fourth son of the tenth Earl (see Baron Erskine for earlier history of this branch of the family). , the titles are held by the sixteenth Earl's grandson, the eighteenth Earl, who succeeded his father in that year.

The family seat is Newnham House, near Newnham, Hampshire.

List of titleholders

Early Mormaers/Earls of Buchan

Unknowns
?Cainnech (fl. early 12th century)
Gartnait (fl. after 1131)
Éva (Éua) ingen Garnait (fl. 1174 )
m. Colbán (fl. 1174 )
Fergus (d. before 1214)
Marjory
m. William Comyn, Justiciar of Scotia and Warden of Moray (d. 1233)
Alexander Comyn (d. 1289)
John Comyn (d. 1308)
 Forfeited; Title claimed by Alice Comyn, and her husband Henry Beaumont (d. 1340)

Earls of Buchan; Second creation (1374)
Alexander Stewart, Earl of Buchan (d. 1405)
Robert Stewart, Duke of Albany (d. 1420), in 1406 he granted earldom to his son
John Stewart, Earl of Buchan (d. 1424) – Killed at the Battle of Verneuil
James I of Scotland. (d. 1437)
Mary Stewart, Countess of Buchan (1428–1465), Countess from 1444
Wolfert VI van Borselen (1433–1489), jure uxoris Earl of Buchan from 1444 until 1469, Stadholder of Holland, Friesland and Zeeland

Earls of Buchan; Third creation (1469)
James Stewart, 1st Earl of Buchan (1442–1487)
Alexander Stewart, 2nd Earl of Buchan (d. 1505)
John Stewart, 3rd Earl of Buchan (c. 1497–1551)
Christina Stewart, 4th Countess of Buchan (d. 1580)
James Douglas, 5th Earl of Buchan (d. 1601)
Mary Douglas, 6th Countess of Buchan (d. 1628) (title of 6th Earl assumed by her husband James Erskine, 6th Earl of Buchan (died 1640))
James Erskine, 7th Earl of Buchan (succeeded 1640, d. 1664)
William Erskine, 8th Earl of Buchan (d. 1695)
David Erskine, 9th Earl of Buchan (d. 1745)
Henry David Erskine, 10th Earl of Buchan (1710–1767)
David Stewart Erskine, 11th Earl of Buchan (1742–1829)
Henry David Erskine, 12th Earl of Buchan (1783–1857)
David Stuart Erskine, 13th Earl of Buchan (1815–1898)
Shipley Gordon Stuart Erskine, 14th Earl of Buchan (1850–1934)
Ronald Douglas Stewart Mar Erskine, 15th Earl of Buchan (1878–1960)
Donald Cardross Flower Erskine, 16th Earl of Buchan (1899–1984)
Malcolm Erskine, 17th Earl of Buchan (1930–2022)
Henry Thomas Alexander Erskine, 18th Earl of Buchan (b. 1960)

Present peer
Henry Erskine, 18th Earl of Buchan (born 31 May 1960) is the elder son of the 17th Earl and his wife Hilary Diana Cecil Power. He was educated at Eton College and was styled as Lord Cardross between 1984 and 11 September 2022, when he succeeded to the peerages. In 1987 he married Charlotte Catherine Lucinda Beaumont, a daughter of the Hon. Matthew Henry Beaumont and a granddaughter of Wentworth Beaumont, 2nd Viscount Allendale. They had two sons:

Alexander Erskine, Lord Cardross (born 1990), heir apparent
Frederick Alastair Erskine (born 1992)

Family tree

See also
Earl of Atholl
Earl of Mar
Lord Cardross
Baron Erskine

References

Bibliography
 Anderson, Alan Orr, Early Sources of Scottish History: AD 500–1286, 2 vols. (Edinburgh, 1922), Vol. II, p. 180, n. 3
 Jackson, Kenneth (ed.), The Gaelic Notes in the Book of Deer (The Osborn Bergin Memorial Lecture 1970), (Cambridge, 1972)
 Paul, James Balfour, The Scots Peerage, Vol. II, (Edinburgh, 1909)
 Roberts, John L., Lost Kingdoms: Celtic Scotland in the Middle Ages, (Edinburgh, 1997), pp. 55–6
 Young, Alan, "Buchan in the 13th century" in Alexander Grant & Keith J. Stringer (eds.) Medieval Scotland: Crown, Lordship and Community Essays Presented to G. W. S. Barrow, (Edinburgh, 1993)

External links 

 Gaelic Notes on the Book of Deer
 McGladdery, Christine, James II. Edinburgh 1990, p. 7.

Earldoms in the Peerage of Scotland
Extinct earldoms in the Peerage of Scotland

Noble titles created in 1221
Noble titles created in 1374
Noble titles created in 1469
Earl
Clan Comyn